Ernst Laas (June 16, 1837 – July 25, 1885) was a German positivist philosopher.

Biography
Laas was born in Fürstenwalde, Brandenburg, Prussia. He studied theology and philosophy under Friedrich Adolf Trendelenburg at the University of Berlin. In 1859, he completed a doctorate at Berlin with a thesis titled Das Moral-Prinzip des Aristoteles.

He became a professor of philosophy at the University of Strasbourg in 1872. In his Kants Analogien der Erfahrung (Kant's Analogies of Experiences, 1876) he keenly criticized Immanuel Kant's transcendentalism, and in his chief work Idealismus und Positivismus (Idealism and Positivism, 1879–1884, 3 volumes), he drew a clear contrast between Platonism, from which he derived transcendentalism, and positivism, of which he considered Protagoras the founder. Laas in reality was a disciple of David Hume. Throughout his philosophy he endeavours to connect metaphysics with ethics and the theory of education.

He died in Straßburg, Germany (now Strasbourg, France).

Works
His chief educational works were Der deutsche Aufsatz in den ersten Gymnasialklassen (1868), and Der deutsche Unterricht auf höhern Lehranstalten (1872; 2nd ed. 1886). He contributed largely to the Vierteljahrsschrift für wissenschaftliche Philosophie (1880–82); the Literarischer Nachlass, a posthumous collection, was published at Vienna (1887).

Notes

References
 This work in turn cites:
 Hanisch, Der Positivismus von Ernst Laas (1902)
 Gjurits, Die Erkenntnistheorie des Ernst Laas (1903)
 Falckenberg, Hist. of Mod. Philos. (Eng. trans., 1895)

1837 births
1885 deaths
People from Fürstenwalde
People from the Province of Brandenburg
German philosophers
German male writers
Humboldt University of Berlin alumni
Academic staff of the University of Strasbourg